The 67th Annual Tony Awards were held June 9, 2013, to recognize achievement in Broadway productions during the 2012–13 season. The ceremony returned to Radio City Music Hall in New York City, after two years at Beacon Theatre, and was broadcast live on CBS television. Neil Patrick Harris hosted for the third consecutive year, his fourth time as host.  Awards in four of the eight acting categories, (Best Actress in a Play, Best Actor in a Musical, Best Actress in a Musical, Best Featured Actor in a Play) were given to African-American performers.  Furthermore, it is the second time in Tony history that both directing prizes went to women.  Garry Hynes and Julie Taymor had previously won in 1998. Kinky Boots had a season best 13 nominations and 6 awards.  Cyndi Lauper, composer of the score for Kinky Boots, is the first solo female winner for Best Original Score.

Eligibility
Shows that opened on Broadway during the 2012–13 season before April 25, 2013 were eligible for consideration.

Original plays
The Anarchist
Ann
The Assembled Parties
Breakfast at Tiffany's
Dead Accounts
Grace
I'll Eat You Last: A Chat with Sue Mengers
Lucky Guy
The Nance
The Other Place
The Testament of Mary
Vanya and Sonia and Masha and Spike

Original musicals
Bring It On: The Musical
Chaplin
A Christmas Story: The Musical
Hands on a Hardbody
Kinky Boots
Matilda the Musical
Motown: The Musical
Scandalous: The Life and Trials of Aimee Semple McPherson

Play revivals
The Big Knife
Cat on a Hot Tin Roof
Cyrano de Bergerac
An Enemy of the People
Glengarry Glen Ross
Golden Boy
Harvey
The Heiress
Macbeth
Orphans
Picnic
The Trip to Bountiful
Who's Afraid of Virginia Woolf?

Musical revivals
Annie
Jekyll & Hyde
The Mystery of Edwin Drood
Pippin
Rodgers + Hammerstein's Cinderella

The ceremony
The ceremony featured performances from Tony-nominated musicals in this season: 
Matilda The Musical – medley; "Naughty," "Revolting Children," and "When I Grow Up"
Bring It On: The Musical – "It's All Happening"
Rodgers and Hammerstein's Cinderella – "In My Own Little Corner," "Impossible," and "Ten Minutes Ago"
Motown: The Musical – medley 
Annie – "It's the Hard Knock Life" and "Little Girls"  
A Christmas Story: The Musical – "You'll Shoot Your Eye Out"
Pippin – medley; "Corner of the Sky" and "Magic to Do"  
Kinky Boots – "Everybody Say Yeah"

The casts of musicals currently running on Broadway introduced the musical nominees, including Chicago; Jersey Boys; Newsies; Once; Mamma Mia!; Rock of Ages; Spider-Man: Turn Off the Dark; and The Lion King. The casts of Once, The Phantom of the Opera, and The Rascals performed.

The Emmy-winning opening number "Bigger!", written by Lin-Manuel Miranda and Tom Kitt, starred Neil Patrick Harris and "featured neophyte cheerleaders, contortionists, chirpy newsies, a scene-hogging Mike Tyson and, in a Broadway season notable for the number of children in its shows, enough pint-size performers to fill, as Harris aptly quipped, a Chuck-E-Cheese." During the ceremony, three Broadway performers, Andrew Rannells, Megan Hilty, and Laura Benanti, whose television shows have been cancelled, sang a comic "failed TV career" medley with Harris. The song was based on several familiar Broadway melodies, including "America", "What I Did For Love", and "The Ladies Who Lunch", with lyrics by Michael John LaChiusa.

During the "In Memoriam" tribute, Cyndi Lauper performed her 1986 hit "True Colors".

The closing number featured Harris and Audra McDonald singing special lyrics to Empire State of Mind, mentioning the winners.

Nominees and winners
The nominees were announced on April 30, 2013. Source for winners: Playbill

{| class=wikitable width="95%"
|-
! style="background:#C0C0C0;" ! width="50%" | Best Play
! style="background:#C0C0C0;" ! width="50%" | Best Musical
|-
| valign="top" |
 Vanya and Sonia and Masha and Spike – Christopher Durang
 The Assembled Parties – Richard Greenberg
 Lucky Guy – Nora Ephron
 The Testament of Mary – Colm Tóibín
| valign="top" |
 Kinky Boots
 Bring It On: The Musical 
 A Christmas Story: The Musical
 Matilda the Musical
|-
! style="background:#C0C0C0;" ! style="width="50%" | Best Revival of a Play
! style="background:#C0C0C0;" ! style="width="50%" | Best Revival of a Musical
|-
| valign="top" |
 Who's Afraid of Virginia Woolf?
 Golden Boy
 Orphans
 The Trip to Bountiful
| valign="top" |
 Pippin
Annie
 The Mystery of Edwin Drood
 Rodgers + Hammerstein's Cinderella
|-
! style="background:#C0C0C0;" ! style="width="50%" | Best Performance by a Leading Actor in a Play
! style="background:#C0C0C0;" ! style="width="50%" | Best Performance by a Leading Actress in a Play
|-
| valign="top" |
 Tracy Letts – Who's Afraid of Virginia Woolf? as George
 Tom Hanks – Lucky Guy as Mike McAlary
 Nathan Lane – The Nance as Chauncey
 David Hyde Pierce – Vanya and Sonia and Masha and Spike as Vanya
 Tom Sturridge – Orphans as Phillip
| valign="top" |
 Cicely Tyson – The Trip to Bountiful as Miss Carrie Watts
 Laurie Metcalf – The Other Place as Juliana Smithton
 Amy Morton – Who's Afraid of Virginia Woolf? as Martha
 Kristine Nielsen – Vanya and Sonia and Masha and Spike as Sonia
 Holland Taylor – Ann as Ann Richards
|-
! style="background:#C0C0C0;" ! style="width="50%" | Best Performance by a Leading Actor in a Musical
! style="background:#C0C0C0;" ! style="width="50%" | Best Performance by a Leading Actress in a Musical
|-
| valign="top" |
 Billy Porter – Kinky Boots as Lola
Bertie Carvel – Matilda the Musical as Miss Trunchbull
 Santino Fontana – Rodgers + Hammerstein's Cinderella as Prince Topher
 Rob McClure – Chaplin as Charlie Chaplin
 Stark Sands – Kinky Boots as Charlie Price
| valign="top" |
 Patina Miller – Pippin as The Leading Player 
Stephanie J. Block – The Mystery of Edwin Drood as Edwin Drood / Miss Alice Nutting
 Carolee Carmello – Scandalous as Aimee Semple McPherson
 Valisia LeKae – Motown: The Musical as Diana Ross
 Laura Osnes – Rodgers + Hammerstein's Cinderella as Ella
|-
! style="background:#C0C0C0;" ! style="width="50%" | Best Performance by a Featured Actor in a Play
! style="background:#C0C0C0;" ! style="width="50%" | Best Performance by a Featured Actress in a Play
|-
| valign="top" |
 Courtney B. Vance – Lucky Guy as Hap Hairston
 Danny Burstein – Golden Boy as Tokio
 Richard Kind – The Big Knife as Marcus Hoff
 Billy Magnussen – Vanya and Sonia and Masha and Spike as Spike 
 Tony Shalhoub – Golden Boy as Mr. Bonaparte
| valign="top" |
 Judith Light – The Assembled Parties as Faye
 Carrie Coon – Who's Afraid of Virginia Woolf? as Honey
 Shalita Grant – Vanya and Sonia and Masha and Spike as Cassandra
 Judith Ivey – The Heiress as Lavinia Penniman
 Condola Rashād – The Trip to Bountiful as Thelma 
|-
! style="background:#C0C0C0;" ! style="width="50%" | Best Performance by a Featured Actor in a Musical
! style="background:#C0C0C0;" ! style="width="50%" | Best Performance by a Featured Actress in a Musical
|-
| valign="top" |
 Gabriel Ebert – Matilda the Musical as Mr. Wormwood
 Charl Brown – Motown: The Musical as Smokey Robinson
 Keith Carradine – Hands on a Hardbody as JD Drew
 Will Chase – The Mystery of Edwin Drood as John Jasper / Mr. Clive Paget
 Terrence Mann – Pippin as King Charles
| valign="top" |
 Andrea Martin – Pippin as Berthe
Annaleigh Ashford – Kinky Boots as Lauren
 Victoria Clark – Rodgers + Hammerstein's Cinderella as Marie/Fairy Godmother
 Keala Settle – Hands on a Hardbody as Norma Valverde
 Lauren Ward – Matilda the Musical as Miss Jennifer "Jenny" Honey
|-
! style="background:#C0C0C0;" ! style="width="50%" | Best Book of a Musical
! style="background:#C0C0C0;" ! style="width="50%" | Best Original Score (Music and/or Lyrics) Written for the Theatre
|-
| valign="top" |
 Matilda the Musical – Dennis KellyA Christmas Story, The Musical – Joseph Robinette
 Kinky Boots – Harvey Fierstein
 Rodgers + Hammerstein's Cinderella – Douglas Carter Beane
| valign="top" |
 Kinky Boots – Cyndi Lauper (music and lyrics) A Christmas Story, The Musical – Benj Pasek and Justin Paul (music and lyrics)
 Hands on a Hardbody – Trey Anastasio (music) and Amanda Green (music and lyrics)
 Matilda the Musical – Tim Minchin (music and lyrics)

|-
! style="background:#C0C0C0;" ! style="width="50%" | Best Scenic Design of a Play
! style="background:#C0C0C0;" ! style="width="50%" | Best Scenic Design of a Musical
|-
| valign="top" |
 John Lee Beatty – The Nance
 Santo Loquasto – The Assembled Parties
 David Rockwell – Lucky Guy
 Michael Yeargan – Golden Boy
| valign="top" |
 Rob Howell – Matilda the Musical Anna Louizos – The Mystery of Edwin Drood Scott Pask – Pippin David Rockwell – Kinky Boots|-
! style="background:#C0C0C0;" ! style="width="50%" | Best Costume Design of a Play
! style="background:#C0C0C0;" ! style="width="50%" | Best Costume Design of a Musical
|-
| valign="top" |
 Ann Roth – The Nance
 Soutra Gilmour – Cyrano de Bergerac Albert Wolsky – The Heiress Catherine Zuber – Golden Boy| valign="top" |
 William Ivey Long – Rodgers + Hammerstein's Cinderella
 Gregg Barnes – Kinky Boots Rob Howell – Matilda the Musical Dominique Lemieux – Pippin|-
! style="background:#C0C0C0;" ! style="width="50%" | Best Lighting Design of a Play
! style="background:#C0C0C0;" ! style="width="50%" | Best Lighting Design of a Musical
|-
| valign="top" |
 Jules Fisher and Peggy Eisenhauer – Lucky Guy
 Donald Holder – Golden Boy Jennifer Tipton – The Testament of Mary Japhy Weideman – The Nance| valign="top" |
 Hugh Vanstone – Matilda the Musical
Kenneth Posner – Rodgers + Hammerstein's Cinderella Kenneth Posner – Kinky Boots Kenneth Posner – Pippin|-
! style="background:#C0C0C0;" ! style="width="50%" | Best Sound Design of a Play
! style="background:#C0C0C0;" ! style="width="50%" | Best Sound Design of a Musical
|-
| valign="top" |
 Leon Rothenberg – The Nance
 John Gromada – The Trip to Bountiful Mel Mercier – The Testament of Mary Peter John Still and Marc Salzberg – Golden Boy| valign="top" |
 John Shivers – Kinky Boots
 Jonathan Deans and Garth Helm – Pippin Peter Hylenski – Motown: The Musical Nevin Steinberg – Rodgers + Hammerstein's Cinderella|-
! style="background:#C0C0C0;" ! style="width="50%" | Best Direction of a Play
! style="background:#C0C0C0;" ! style="width="50%" | Best Direction of a Musical
|-
| valign="top" |
 Pam MacKinnon – Who's Afraid of Virginia Woolf?
 Nicholas Martin – Vanya and Sonia and Masha and Spike Bartlett Sher – Golden Boy George C. Wolfe – Lucky Guy| valign="top" |
 Diane Paulus – Pippin
 Scott Ellis – The Mystery of Edwin Drood Jerry Mitchell – Kinky Boots Matthew Warchus – Matilda the Musical|-
! style="background:#C0C0C0;" ! style="width="50%" | Best Choreography
! style="background:#C0C0C0;" ! style="width="50%" | Best Orchestrations
|-
| valign="top" |
 Jerry Mitchell – Kinky Boots
 Andy Blankenbuehler – Bring It On: The Musical Peter Darling – Matilda the Musical Chet Walker – Pippin| valign="top" |
 Stephen Oremus – Kinky Boots
 Christopher Nightingale – Matilda the Musical Ethan Popp and Bryan Crook – Motown: The Musical Danny Troob –  Rodgers + Hammerstein's Cinderella|}

Multiple nominations
 13: Kinky Boots 12: Matilda the Musical 10: Pippin 9: Rodgers + Hammerstein's Cinderella 8: Golden Boy 6: Lucky Guy, Vanya and Sonia and Masha and Spike 5: The Mystery of Edwin Drood, The Nance, Who's Afraid of Virginia Woolf? 4: Motown: The Musical, The Trip to Bountiful 3: The Assembled Parties, A Christmas Story, The Musical,  Hands on a Hardbody, The Testament of Mary 2: Bring It On: The Musical, The Heiress, OrphansMultiple wins
 6: Kinky Boots 
 4:  Matilda the Musical, Pippin 3: The Nance, Who's Afraid of Virginia Woolf? 2: Lucky GuyNote: The four child actresses who created the title role in Matilda were also recognized with a special Tony Honor for Excellence in the Theatre.

Non-competitive awards
The Special Tony Award for Lifetime Achievement in the Theatre was awarded to Bernard Gersten, executive producer of Lincoln Center Theater; scenic designer Ming Cho Lee; and Paul Libin, executive vice president of Jujamcyn Theaters.

The Tony Honors for Excellence in Theatre was awarded to New York City Mayor Michael Bloomberg, Career Transition For Dancers, William "Bill" Craver, Peter Lawrence (Production Stage Manager) and The Lost Colony (Roanoke Island, Manteo, North Carolina).

The Tony Honors for Excellence in Theatre was given jointly to Sophia Gennusa, Oona Laurence, Bailey Ryon and Milly Shapiro, who share the lead role in Matilda, The Musical''. They were not eligible in the Best Performance by an Actress in a Musical category. The Tony Awards Administration Committee stated that they "recognize their outstanding performances this season." The awards were presented at the Tony Eve Cocktail Party, a private cocktail reception, held on June 8, 2013, one day prior to the main ceremony.

Larry Kramer received the Isabelle Stevenson Award. He was "recognized for his work as the co-founder of Gay Men's Health Crisis".

The Huntington Theater Company in Boston, Massachusetts received the Regional Theatre Tony Award.

In Memoriam
During the tribute Cyndi Lauper sang the song True Colors.

Jean Stapleton
Richard Adler
Richard Briers
Hal David
Nora Ephron
Charles Durning
Bonnie Franklin
Joan Stein
Milo O'Shea
Jack Klugman
Martin Richards
Martin Pakledinaz
Porter Van Zandt
Virginia Gibson
Arthur Storch
Andy Griffith
Victor Spinetti
Richard Griffiths
Gore Vidal
John Kerr
Roy Miller
Mark O'Donnell
Larry L. King
Celeste Holm
Eugene V. Wolsk
Larry Payton
Gloria Hope Sher
Manheim Fox
Albert Marre
James Grout
Sam Crothers
Marvin Hamlisch

Broadcast ratings
The ceremony's original live broadcast on CBS was watched by 7.3 million viewers and received a 1.2/4 rating/share in the 18-49 demographic. The 2013 viewers increased over the 2012 Tony Awards broadcast, which had approximately 6.01 million viewers.

See also
 Drama Desk Awards
 2013 Laurence Olivier Awards – equivalent awards for West End theatre productions
 Obie Award
 New York Drama Critics' Circle
 Theatre World Award
 Lucille Lortel Awards

References

External links
 Tony Awards Official Site
 

Tony Awards ceremonies
2013 theatre awards
2013 awards in the United States
2013 in New York City
2010s in Manhattan
Television shows directed by Glenn Weiss